This is a list of wars involving the Sultanate of Oman and its predecessor states.

References

 
Oman
Wars